The 76 mm gun M1 was an American World War II–era tank gun developed by the U.S United States Ordnance Department in 1942 to supplement the 75 mm gun on the basic Medium tank M4. It was also used to arm the M18 Hellcat tank destroyer.

Although the gun was tested in early August 1942 and classified on August 17, 1942, it was not until August 1943 that the Ordnance Department developed a mounting for the M4 tank that the tank forces would accept. It was not accepted for combat until July 1944. In January 1943, the decision was made to mount the 76 mm on the vehicle that would become the M18. By May 1944, it was being combat tested as the T70.

Design and development
Before the United States had battle experience against heavily armored German tanks, the development of a weapon superior to the 75 mm gun was anticipated. The original Ordnance Department specifications of 11 September 1941 for the M4 tank allowed for the mounting of numerous weapons including the 3 inch gun. The first specimens of the weapon that was to become the 76 mm Gun M1 were being evaluated in August 1942 while the U.S. did not enter the ground war in the European-African-Middle Eastern region until Operation Torch in November 1942.

It was a new gun with a breech similar to that of the 75 mm M3 Gun but with a new tube (barrel and cartridge chamber) design to accommodate a new cartridge. It fired the same projectiles as the 3-inch Gun M1918  M7 gun mounted on the 3in Gun Motor Carriage M10 tank destroyer and towed 3-inch Gun M5 anti-tank gun, but from a different cartridge case. The "76-mm" designation was chosen to help keep the supply of ammunition from being confused between the two guns. The 76 mm also differed in that successive models received a muzzle brake and faster rifle twist.

Aberdeen Proving Ground began evaluations of the first test guns, designated the T1, around August 1, 1942. The first test guns had a bore length of 57 calibers and when tested on an M4 tank; it was found that the long barrel caused balance problems. Another T1 test gun was produced with the barrel shortened to 52 calibers and a counterweight added to the breech guard to improve balance.

By August 17, the Ordnance Department had classified the test gun with the shorter barrel as the 76-mm M1  and set up the precedent for the designation of M4 tanks armed with the gun to include "(76M1)".

Tests of production M1 guns revealed that the gun with its counterweight also had issues with binding when trying to rotate the turret when the tank was resting at a steep angle. An  storage box was added to the turret rear to improve balance, with evaluations held in early 1943 and the final report tendered in April 1943. This worked, but was rejected by the Armored Force due to the turret being cramped.

A more satisfactory mounting was found in August 1943 by utilizing the turret design of the T23 tank on the M4 chassis to carry the 76 mm gun. The 76 mm M1A1 version of the gun was then created, having a longer recoil surface to also help with balance by permitting the placement of the trunnions further to the front.

Production and tactical doctrine
By August 1943, the M4 tank armed with the 76 mm gun in the modified T23 turret was finally ready for production. A proposal was made by the Armored Force for a test run of 1,000 tanks for combat trials and, if that was successful, then devoting all M4 tank manufacturing capacity to those armed with the 76 mm gun. This was changed to a rate that would equip 1/3 of the M4 tanks with the 76 mm gun.

The production proposal was part of a memo in September 1943 pointing out various flaws of the gun that made it less desirable for tank use: muzzle blast, a weaker high explosive shell, more awkward ammunition handling, and ammunition storage. In a meeting in April 1944 held to discuss the assignment of the first production M4(76M1) tanks received in Britain to units, a presentation comparing the 76 mm to the 75 mm went over similar points, adding that the 76 mm was more accurate, but did not yet have an appropriate smoke round.

Muzzle blast
The muzzle blast of early 76 mm guns obscured the target with smoke and dust. This could prevent the gunner from seeing where the projectile struck. The Ordnance Department initially reduced the amount of smoke by using a long primer that gave a more complete burn of the propellant before it exited the barrel. The revised ammunition began to be issued for use in August 1944. Muzzle brakes, that redirected the blast left and right, were tested in January 1944 and authorized in February 1944, with production starting in June 1944. Mid-production guns (M1A1C) were threaded for a muzzle brake, with the threads covered by a protector cap. Enough muzzle brakes were produced to allow them to be released onto M4 production lines in the fall.

For those vehicles that did not have a muzzle brake, once the Armored Force began to accept M4s, it was recommended that tank commanders stand outside the tank and "spot" the strike of rounds to guide the gunner.

High-explosive capacity
Far more high explosive ammunition was used by tankers than armor piercing types, the ratio being about 70% HE, 20% AP and 10% smoke overall, The ratio could vary by unit: From August 3 to December 31, 1944 the 13th Tank Battalion fired 55 rounds of M62 APC-T armor piercing versus 19,634 rounds of M42 high explosive.

Smoke ammunition
The M88 smoke round for the 76 mm provided a "curtain" of smoke. The tankers found the 75 mm M64 WP (White Phosphorus) smoke projectile useful not only for providing smoke coverage but also attacking targets including enemy tanks. Some units equipped with the 76 mm preferred to maintain a 75 mm armed tank on hand to provide the M88 WP projectile.

Round size
It was thought that the longer and heavier 76 mm might hamper handling inside the tank's turret, slowing the rate of fire. This may have been more of a concern than was warranted: on April 22, 1945, the crew of an M4 76 mm crew encountered an unidentified vehicle – which was actually a British scout car – in an ambush position, and the "76 roared twice in rapid succession". The British gunner stated that his vehicle had been destroyed, before "I could lay my hand on the trigger".

It was also thought that the longer 76 mm would reduce ammunition capacity. The 76 mm was first tested on the M4A1 series tank which carried 90 rounds of 75 mm ammunition, while most other models carried 97 rounds of 75 mm. The 76 mm cartridge reduced this to 83 rounds. By late 1943, the Army had adopted the wet storage system of water containers among the rounds, to reduce fires and for the 76 mm gun this provided 71 rounds of ammunition, while the 75 mm could carry 104 rounds. Storage depended on organization: The 76-mm T72 Gun Motor Carriage, designed to mount the 76-mm on the M10 GMC chassis in a T23 turret lightened for the job, carried 99 rounds (but not in wet storage).

Operational history

US service
The 76 mm gun saw first use in a test batch of M18 Hellcat gun motor carriages in Italy in May 1944, under their development designation T70. The moderate performance of the 76 mm gun by 1944 standards was one of three reasons the plans for M18 production were cut from 8,986 to 2,507, of which 650 were converted to unarmed utility vehicles. An experiment was performed mounting the 90-mm armed M36 turret on an M18 to provide more firepower than the 76-mm.

The first M4 tanks armed with 76 mm guns intended for combat were produced in January 1944. Tanks equipped with the gun began arriving in Britain in April 1944. The issue with muzzle blast had not been addressed and higher-level commanders had doubts about the use of, let alone need for, the new weapon. The medium-velocity 75 mm M3 gun, which first armed the standard M4 Sherman, was quite capable of dealing with most of the German armored fighting vehicles met in 1942 and 1943, and had better high explosive capability and fewer issues with muzzle blast. It was not until July 1944 that a call for M4s armed with 76 mm guns was put out in France after unexpectedly high losses by US tank units and the arrival of numerous Panther tanks on the US sector of the front.

Deliveries of the 76-mm armed tanks lagged such that by January 1945 they made up only 25% of the tanks in Europe. Plans were made by field units to directly replace the 75s on some tanks using a weight welded to the turret rear to balance it. A prototype was built, but the supply of ready-made tanks increased and that project ended.

The 75 mm armed M4 tanks were never completely replaced during the war with some units in Europe still had about a 50/50 mix. Units in Italy readily accepted the 76 mm, but were never shipped as many as desired. The US units in the Pacific Theater relied mainly on the 75 mm gun. The 76 mm-armed M18 did see use in the Pacific late in the war.

Performance

 
The 76 mm M1, while an improvement over the previous 75 mm, was a disappointment in its promised performance vis-à-vis the Panther tank and upgraded models of the Panzer IV Ausf. H/J in the frontal arcs. This was the case of the 76 mm M1 versus the frontal armor of these tanks only. The other arcs did not present a problem. The cause of this was the M62A1 APC round issued with the gun. Another issue surfaces on detailed analysis with a change induced by the problem with the M18 turret and the weight of the original 76/57 development gun. The problem is that the M18 turret was strained by the forward weight of the barrel. In production, the 76mm M1 was shortened to 52 calibers to address this issue. The result was a loss in velocity and this also affected the anti-armor performance of the shell. In response to the lack of performance and displeasure expressed at high levels at the lack of performance, a new shell was developed. The 76 mm M93 High-Velocity, Armor-Piercing Tracer (HVAP-T) was a large improvement being an Armor Piercing Composite Rigid shot, where the full bore, lightweight outer shell contained a slug of tungsten alloy. This improved velocity, thus penetration, but the APCR slowed faster than the AP shot or APHE shell, such that penetration dropped below that of the previous two rounds at around 1,500 yards. The American APCR data seems to indicate that US designs were superior to German and their Soviet copies in retaining their velocity to longer ranges. The US Army did not adopt the APDS shot until the middle 1950s as the British designs had significant dispersion problems from point of aim, being less accurate. In the ETO the determination of the effective range of engagements between armor fell into at or under 890 yards. The shell brought the Panzer IV turret penetration to 1,850 yards. The Panther remained immune in the frontal arc. The side and rear arcs remained vulnerable out to 2,500 yards. What was missing to achieve the range and penetration of 890 yards that the US Army desired goal against the Panther was 500 fps in velocity, 3400 fps vs. the required 3900 fps.

British service
The UK had developed a more effective anti-tank gun before the 76 mm gun became widely available. Although only slightly longer at 55 calibers, their Ordnance QF 17 pounder (76.2 mm) anti-tank gun had a much larger 76.2×583mmR cartridge case, which used about  more propellant. The anti-tank performance of the 76 mm was inferior to the British 17-pounder, more so if the latter was using APDS discarding sabot rounds, though with that ammunition the 17-pounder was less accurate than the 76 mm. The 17-pounder was also much larger and had a longer recoil than the 76 mm, which required a redesign of the turret and despite this, made the turret very cramped. The 17-pounder also had a less effective HE round. The 76 mm gunned Shermans supplied to the British were only used in Italy or by the Polish 1st Armoured Division in north-west Europe. The British and Commonwealth units in north-west Europe supported their 75 mm gunned Shermans with 17-pounder armed Sherman Fireflies.

Soviet service
The first 76-mm-armed Shermans started to reach Red Army units in late summer 1944. In 1945, some units were standardized to depend mostly on them, transferring their T-34s to other units. Parts of the Polish First Army also briefly used M4A2 (76 mm) tanks, borrowed from the Red Army after heavy losses in the conquest of Danzig.

After World War II

Korea
By the end of 1950, more than 500 76mm gun M4A3E8 tanks were in Korea. These 76 mm-armed Shermans served well in the Korean War and, having better crew training and gun optics, had little problem piercing the armor of North Korean-manned T-34/85 tanks when firing HVAP rounds, which were amply supplied to units. Some 76 mm-armed M4s  and M18s were distributed around the world and used by other countries post-war. The 76 mm gun was sometimes replaced by a more powerful weapon in service with other nations after World War II.

Israel
France delivered 76 mm-gunned Sherman tanks to Israel which used them in Operation Kadesh against Egypt in 1956 and in the 1967 Six day war, particularly in the conquest of Jerusalem. Some were still used as bulldozer tanks in the Yom Kippur War in 1973.

The Balkans
Some M4A3E4s, retrofitted with the M1A1 76 mm gun, as well as a few M18s, were used by various sides during the civil conflicts of former Yugoslavia during the 1990s.

India and Pakistan
Pakistan bought 547 M4A1E6(76)s during the 1950s and used them in 1965 and 1971 Indo-Pakistani Wars with neighbouring India, which also fielded Sherman tanks (M4A3E4s) as well.

Uganda
Uganda purchased a few ex-Israeli M4A1(76)Ws and used them during the Idi Amin regime up until the Ugandan-Tanzanian War.

Variants
T1: Originally 57 calibers long gun, reduced to 52 calibers after tests in effort to improve balance
M1: 52 calibers long version of gun adopted for use 
M1A1: M1 with longer recoil surface to allow it to be mounted on trunions placed 12 inches further forward
M1A1C: M1A1 threaded for muzzle brake 
M1A2: M1A1C with rifling twist changed from 1:40 calibers to 1:32 calibers

A muzzle brake was tested in January 1944, authorized in February 1944 with production starting June 1944. Not all guns received them. The threads of those without a brake were covered by a protector visible in many pictures.

From 1943, at the instigation of the head of the Armored Force General Jacob Devers, US Ordnance worked on a towed anti-tank gun based on the barrel of the M1, known as "76 mm gun T2 on carriage T3". Later interest in the project declined and the program was officially cancelled in 1945.

Ammunition
While the 76 mm had less High Explosive (HE) and smoke performance than the 75 mm, the higher-velocity 76 mm gave better anti-tank performance, with firepower similar to many of the armored fighting vehicles it encountered, particularly the Panzer IV tank and StuG assault gun vehicles.

The standard M62A1 Armor Piercing Capped projectile was of the APCBC design.

The substitute standard M79 Armor Piercing solid monobloc shot had no filler, windscreen, or penetrating cap.

The M88 H.C. B.I. Smoke Shell contained a filler of H.C. Based on a British design, it was intended to provide a slow-release "curtain" of smoke versus the exploding white phosphorus shell available to the 75-mm and other cannon originally designed for artillery spotting but which could also cause damaging burns.

It was an entirely different case from the 3-inch MKIIM2 case used for the 3-inch M3 anti-aircraft gun and 3-inch M5, M6, and M7 guns used on the a towed anti-tank gun, M6 heavy tank, and M10 Gun Motor Carriage. The 76-mm chamber capacity varied by projectile (also given is the capacities for similar 3-inch rounds to illustrate the size differences):

The 3 inch cartridge was not completely filled by the propellants used; a distance wad was used to keep the propellant pressed against the primer end.

Vehicles mounting the 76 mm

With British Commonwealth designations in parentheses:

76 mm Gun Motor Carriage M18
Medium Tank M4A1(76)W (Sherman IIA)
Medium Tank M4A1(76)W HVSS (Sherman IIAY)
Medium Tank M4A2(76)W (Sherman IIIA)
Medium Tank M4A2(76)W HVSS (Sherman IIIAY)
Medium Tank M4A3(76)W (Sherman IVA)
Medium Tank M4A3(76)W HVSS
T23 medium tank
T72 experimental Gun Motor Carriage

Performance

Similar, alternative weapons
The 76 mm M1 was a project initiated by the Ordnance Department itself. Various entities suggested other weapon options which were not pursued.

The Armored Board (the Armored Forces evaluation center at Fort Knox) suggested the production of 1,000 M4 medium tanks armed with 90-mm guns in the fall of 1943.
The British expressed interest in mounting their 17-pounder on the M4 in August 1943, offering a monthly allotment of 200 weapons and ammunition, which could begin three months following acceptance. By the time that the US took this up in 1944, the British were too busy with their own conversions resulting in the Sherman Firefly. Some conversions destined for the US Army were performed in 1945 but did not see combat.

See also
List of U.S. Army weapons by supply catalog designation

Weapons of comparable role, performance and era
British Ordnance QF 17 pounder
German 7.5 cm KwK 40
German 7.5 cm KwK 42
Soviet 85 mm D-5T tank gun
Soviet 100 mm D-10 tank gun

Notes

References

}

Further reading
TM 9-308
SNL C-46
SNL C-58
SNL C-64

External links

USA 75 and 76mm guns
https://web.archive.org/web/20160303205705/http://www.wwiivehicles.com/usa/guns/76-mm.asp
http://www.theshermantank.com/category/76mm-m1a1a2/

76 mm artillery
Tank guns of the United States
World War II artillery of the United States
World War II tank guns
Weapons and ammunition introduced in 1942